"A Fool For A Fool" is a song written by Ike Turner, and released by Ike & Tina Turner in 1964.

Release 
"A Fool For A Fool" was written by Ike Turner produced by Buck Ram. Ram wrote and produced the B-side "No Tears To Cry." Released as a non-album track in April 1964, the single reached No. 47 on the Cash Box R&B chart. At the time of the release, Billboard magazine had discontinued their R&B singles chart from November 30, 1963 to January 23, 1965. Billboard therefore uses Cash Box magazine's stat in their place.

"A Fool For A Fool" was reissued on the compilation album The Ike & Tina Turner Story: 1960–1975 in 2007.

Critical reception 
Cash Box (May 2, 1964): "Chances are Ike & Tina Turner will get back on the big hit track with this Warner Bros. bow. Side to watch is 'A Fool For A Fool,' an infectious rock-a-rhythmic cha cha weeper that has Ike's instrumentalists tastefully backing up Tina's winning (partly) multi-tracked vocal. Backing's a heartfelt beat-balled opus that also rates attention."

Track listing

Chart performance

References 

1964 songs
1964 singles
Ike & Tina Turner songs
Songs written by Ike Turner
Warner Records singles